LDN193189 is a chemical compound used in the study of bone morphogenetic protein signalling through the ALK2, ALK3 and ALK6 receptors. It has been researched for the treatment of fibrodysplasia ossificans progressiva.

See also
 SB-431542

References

Bone morphogenetic protein
Quinolines
Phenylpiperazines
Pyrazolopyrimidines